DZRB may refer to:
 DZRB-AM, an AM radio station broadcasting in Metro Manila with the brand Radyo Pilipinas 1 (RP1)
 DZRB-FM, an FM radio station broadcasting in Naga City with the brand Mom's Radio
 DZRB-TV, a TV station broadcasting in Laoag City with the brand ETC TV-9